The 2021–22 Saint Joseph's Hawks basketball team represented Saint Joseph's University during the 2021–22 NCAA Division I men's basketball season. The Hawks, led by third-year head coach Billy Lange, played their home games at Hagan Arena in Philadelphia, Pennsylvania as members of the Atlantic 10 Conference.

Previous season
In a season limited due to the ongoing COVID-19 pandemic, the Hawks finished the 2020–21 season 5–15 overall, 3–9 in A-10 play to finish in 13th place. As the No. 13 seed in the A-10 tournament, they defeated La Salle in the first round before losing to UMass in the second round.

Offseason

Departures

Incoming Transfers

Recruiting classes

2021 recruiting class

2022 recruiting class

Roster

Schedule and results

|-
!colspan=12 style=| Exhibition

|-
!colspan=12 style=| Non-conference regular season

|-
!colspan=12 style=| Atlantic 10 regular season

|-
!colspan=12 style=| A-10 tournament

References 

Saint Joseph's Hawks men's basketball seasons
Saint Joseph's
Saint Joseph's
Saint Joseph's